Samuel Goldwyn (1882–1974) was an American film entrepreneur.

Samuel Goldwyn may also refer to:

 Samuel Goldwyn Jr. (1926–2015), American film entrepreneur
 Goldwyn Pictures, film production company, 1917–1924
 Samuel Goldwyn Productions, film production company, 1923–1959
 The Samuel Goldwyn Company, film production company, 1979–1997
 Samuel Goldwyn Films, film production company, 2000-present
 Samuel Goldwyn Studio, the Hollywood backlot
 Samuel Goldwyn Writing Awards